The Roman Catholic Cathedral of Tangier, whose full name is the Cathedral of the Immaculate Conception and the Holy Spirit, also known as the Spanish Cathedral, is the seat of the Roman Catholic Archdiocese of Tangier, Morocco.

Background

The Franciscans had a longstanding presence in Morocco, in line with their early tradition of engagement with the Muslim world going back to the famed encounter between Francis of Assisi and Sultan Al-Kamil at Damietta in 1219. For a long time, the only Catholic place of worship in all of Morocco was a Franciscan chapel on the side of the Spanish consulate building near the Petit Socco of Tangier. From the 1860s onward, Father  developed the Franciscan presence in Tangier, including the building of the Church of the Immaculate Conception in the medina in 1880–1881.

In 1882, Lerchundi purchased property outside of the medina, in what was still countryside at the time, with the project of establishing a large Franciscan convent. Lerchundi started the development with the construction of a hospital, which was inaugurated in 1888 (and more than a century later, was repurposed by the Spanish government as a cultural center named after Lerchundi). In 1891 or 1892, Antoni Gaudí visited Tangier and was encouraged by Lerchundi to prepare a highly original  for the convent, inspired by Saharan vernacular architecture.

The convent of the Holy Spirit was eventually built in 1902–1904 on a neo-Renaissance design by Franciscan architect Fray Francisco Serra. The construction of its conventual church's apse started in 1904, but was soon left mostly unrealized. In 1938, the Vicar Apostolic of Morocco (i.e. head of the Catholic Church in Spanish Morocco, based in Tangier), Franciscan Father José María Betanzos y Hormaechevarría, started efforts to revive the church building project next to the convent and make it a new cathedral for the entire Catholic community in Tangier, which was mostly Spanish. No financing was forthcoming from the Spanish government, however, during the Spanish Civil War and its immediate aftermath.

Cathedral

Circumstances changed by the late 1940s. Italy had built a large church a few years earlier on its grounds next to the former Abdelhafid Palace, and the French community was about to start construction of its own church in Tangier's modern city expansion. Francoist Spain aimed at regaining influence in the Tangier International Zone after the end of its military occupation in October 1945, an ambition also illustrated by the completion in 1948 of a prominent new building for the Spanish Consulate in the city. In 1948, Francisco Franco approved the project to build a Spanish cathedral in Tangier and entrusted it to his foreign minister Alberto Martín-Artajo.

After several iterations, Feduchi settled on a streamlined modern design, with a luminous, angular nave and a soaring bell tower inspired by St Mark's Campanile in Venice.

The cathedral was the largest building of Tangier and has been described as "a spur for Spain to assert revenge on other colonial powers for all the humiliations inflicted on the Spaniards in the past" – even though, somewhat ironically, the independence of Morocco made the vision of a Spanish-dominated Tangier irrelevant by the time the building was completed.

The completed cathedral became the seat of the newly established Archdiocese of Tangier that had replaced the Apostolic Vicariate in late 1956. The 45-meter-high spire of its bell tower dominated the skyline of Tangier until the construction of the nearby Mohammed V Mosque, dedicated in 1983.

Art

The cathedral also hosts a suspended crucifix and other works carved by sculptor .

Burials

The remains of Father Lerchundi rest in an underground crypt under the church.

Gallery

See also
 French Church of Tangier
 Our Lady of Mount Carmel Church, Dakhla
 Roman Catholicism in Morocco

References

Roman Catholic cathedrals in Morocco
Churches in Tangier
Roman Catholic churches completed in 1961
20th-century Roman Catholic church buildings
Tourist attractions in Tangier
20th-century architecture in Morocco